Offering to the Storm is a 2020 crime thriller film directed by Fernando González Molina, written by Luiso Berdejo and Dolores Redondo and starring Marta Etura, Leonardo Sbaraglia and Paco Tous. It is the third and final installment in the Baztán Trilogy, following The Invisible Guardian and The Legacy of the Bones.

Plot 
Inspector Amaia Salazar confronts the origins of her nightmares as she unfolds the darkest secrets of the Baztán valley.

Cast

Release
Offering to the Storm was released on July 24, 2020 on Netflix.

References

External links
 
 
 

2020 crime thriller films
2020s mystery thriller films
2020s English-language films
2020s French-language films
2020s German films
2020s Spanish films
2020s Spanish-language films
Atresmedia Cine films
English-language German films
French-language German films
English-language Spanish films
French-language Spanish films
Films based on Spanish novels
Films directed by Fernando González Molina
Films scored by Fernando Velázquez
German crime thriller films
German multilingual films
German mystery thriller films
Spanish crime thriller films
Spanish multilingual films
Spanish mystery thriller films
Spanish sequel films
Spanish-language Netflix original films